Bhola Paswan Shastri (21 September 1914 - 10 September 1984) was an Indian freedom fighter and on three occasions between 1968-71 was former Chief Minister of Bihar state in India.

He was born in Paswan Community in Bairgacchi village of Purnia district. Bhola Paswan Shastri Agriculture College is named after him. Bhola Paswan was a highly educated member of the downtrodden caste and the Shastri title was due to his extensive knowledge. Bhola Paswan was the first Scheduled Caste (SC) Chief Minister of Bihar.

He first became Bihar Chief Minister for 100 days in the unstable fourth Bihar Assembly (1967-1968), but Congress lost majority and a mid-term poll was called. Harihar Singh's Congress government collapsed when Congress split in June 1969. Bhola Paswan Shastri sided with Congress (Org) faction and became chief minister for 13 days. But his coalition proved unstable.  By June 1971, he was back in Congress and became chief minister for 7 months during the run-in to 1972 vidhan sabha polls.

Political career

It was in year 1968 he became Chief Minister for the first time though this term lasted only three months. Also, it was for the first time in Bihar, a Dalit became Chief Minister. He became Chief Minister for second time for 13 days in 1969 and for third time in 1971 for 7 months before political turmoil overtook the state.

Personal Background

Irrespective of his short tenures as Chief Minister, his village remembers him as a favoured son, a three term Chief Minister and an honest person. Local villagers recall him as a person who refused to accumulate personal wealth and a home that continued to be hut even long after the end of his third and last tenure and who continued to sleep on floor. One local villager recalls of him  "He was so honest that he did nothing for himself, nor gave his own village any undue favours". In his village we can find the name boards displayed with his name everywhere and one of the boards in the right side of the road reads "Bhola Paswan Shastri Gram". Local MLA from Dhamdaha, Leshi Singh got a community building built near his ancestral home. However, we find the bylanes of village have open drains and there is very little work available locally for residents and hence waiting for jobs. Even his family sometimes travels to Purnea for work.

Shastri was born in poor home and his father used to work in the home of royal family of Darbhanga. Though members from his caste were not encouraged to study he took interest and went till Kashi Vishwavidyalaya. He never forgot his community and always stood with them. He had no children and in July 2020 it was reported in local television channels on the pitiable condition of his extended family who were forced to live on Government ration. However local political parties and leaders rushed in and offered financial help.

References

Chief Ministers of Bihar
1914 births
People from Purnia district
Rajya Sabha members from Bihar
Indian independence activists from Bihar
Indian National Congress politicians from Bihar
Indian National Congress (Organisation) politicians
Leaders of the Opposition in the Bihar Legislative Assembly
Chief ministers from Indian National Congress (Organisation)
1984 deaths
Indian Congress (Socialist) politicians